Casablanca is a holocene stratovolcano in the Andes of Los Lagos Region, Chile. It is located about  90 km east of the city of Osorno and host on its slopes the Antillanca ski resort. The complex erupted lavas with composition between basalt and andesite and has no recorded historical eruptions. Several scoria cones formed after the last ice age.

References 
 
 

Stratovolcanoes of Chile
Mountains of Chile
Volcanoes of Los Lagos Region
South Volcanic Zone